O'Malley of the Mounted may refer to:
 O'Malley of the Mounted (1921 film), an American silent Western film
 O'Malley of the Mounted (1936 film), an American Western film